The 2008 Major League Soccer season was the 13th season in the history of Major League Soccer.  The season began on March 29 and ended with MLS Cup 2008, on November 23 at The Home Depot Center in Carson, California.

Changes from the 2007 season
 The San Jose Earthquakes returned to play, following a two year hiatus that began in the 2005 offseason, in the Western Conference.
 The top three teams from each conference qualified automatically for the playoffs (up from two).  In addition the two highest remaining point totals, regardless of conference, also qualified (down from four).
 Following the 2008 season, qualification for the SuperLiga was limited to the top four overall finishers not already qualified for the CONCACAF Champions League, after problems related to fixture congestion during the 2008 season. This applied retroactively to the 2008 season, and thus qualification for MLS teams to SuperLiga 2009.
 Automatic qualification for the 2009 Lamar Hunt U.S. Open Cup was awarded to the top six overall finishers, as opposed to the top three finishers in each conference.
 Three teams signed new shirt sponsorship deals:
 Best Buy became the shirt sponsor of the Chicago Fire.
 Glidden became the shirt sponsor of the Columbus Crew.
 Volkswagen became the shirt sponsor of D.C. United.
 Bruce Arena's contract was not renewed by the New York Red Bulls, and Juan Carlos Osorio was hired from the Chicago Fire as a replacement.
 The Chicago Fire promoted assistant coach Denis Hamlett to head coach.
 Frank Yallop was traded by the Los Angeles Galaxy to the San Jose Earthquakes.  1987 Ballon d'Or and Euro 88 winner Ruud Gullit was hired as his replacement.
 John Carver became the head coach of Toronto FC. Mo Johnston remains as manager, but has also taken a front office role as team's director of soccer.
 Bruce Arena replaced Ruud Gullit, who resigned from his role as head coach, and Alexi Lalas, who was fired from his role as president, as both head coach and general manager of the Los Angeles Galaxy.
 Rio Tinto Stadium in Sandy, Utah opened in October as the home of Real Salt Lake.
 The Kansas City Wizards moved to the Kansas side of the metropolitan area, occupying CommunityAmerica Ballpark in Kansas City. This was intended to be a temporary move to the Ballpark, and is scheduled to end in 2011 with the opening of the Livestrong Sporting Park nearby.

Competition format
The format for the 2008 season was as follows:
The season ran from March 29 to November 23.
The 14 teams were split into two seven-team conferences. Each team played 30 games that were evenly divided between home and away games. Each team played every other team twice, home and away, for a total of 26 games.  The remaining four games were played against four regional rivals, two at home and two away.
The three teams from each conference with the most points qualified for the playoffs. In addition, the next two highest point totals, regardless of conference, also qualified. In the first round aggregate goals over two matches determined the winners. The conference finals were played as a single match, and the winners advanced to MLS Cup 2008.  In all rounds, draws were broken with two 15-minute periods of extra time, followed by penalty kicks if necessary.  The away goals rule was not used in any round.
The team with the most points in the regular season won the MLS Supporters' Shield and qualified for the CONCACAF Champions League 2009–10. The MLS Cup winner also qualified for the Champions League 2009–10.  The MLS Cup runner-up qualified for the Champions League 2009–10. An additional berth in the Champions League was also awarded to the winner of the 2008 U.S. Open Cup. If a team qualified for multiple berths into the Champions League, then additional berths were awarded to the highest overall finishing MLS team(s) not already qualified. Also, Toronto FC, as a Canadian-based team, cannot qualify through MLS for the Champions League, and must instead qualify through the Canadian Championship.
The four teams with the most points in the regular season, regardless of conference, who have not qualified for the CONCACAF Champions League qualified for SuperLiga 2009.
The six teams, regardless of conference, with the most points also qualified for berths into the 2009 U.S. Open Cup. The rest of the U.S.-based MLS teams have to qualify for the remaining two berths via a series of play-in games.

Tiebreakers

 Head-to-Head (Points-per-match average)
 Overall Goal Differential
 Overall Total Goals Scored
 Tiebreakers 1-3 applied only to matches on the road
 Tiebreakers 1-3 applied only to matches at home
 Fewest team disciplinary points in the League Fair Play table
 Coin toss

Results table

Standings
For an explanation of the playoff qualifications, see Competition format.

Conference standings

Eastern Conference

Western Conference

Overall standings

2008 MLS Cup Playoffs

1 The New York Red Bulls earned the eighth and final playoff berth, despite finishing fifth in the Eastern Conference. They represent the fourth seed in the Western Conference playoff bracket, as only three teams in the Western Conference qualified for the playoffs.

Statistics

Golden Boot

Goalkeeping leaders

Individual awards

Player of the Week

Player of the Month

Goal of the Week

Team attendance totals

Related competitions

International competitions

CONCACAF Champions' Cup 2008

The Houston Dynamo and D.C. United earned berths in the CONCACAF Champions' Cup by virtue of their MLS Cup and Supporters' Shield wins, respectively.  Houston and D.C. were both victorious in their quarterfinal ties and advanced to the semifinals.  For the second straight year, however, both lost their respective semifinals, and were eliminated.

SuperLiga 2008

D.C. United, Chivas USA, the New England Revolution, and the Houston Dynamo were MLS's entrants into SuperLiga 2008, based on their top-four finish in the 2007 regular season.

Following the Group Stage, which took place from July 12 to July 20, Houston and New England each won their respective groups to advance to the Semifinals, where they faced 2007 champion Pachuca on July 29 and Atlante on July 30, respectively.  D.C. United finished last and Chivas USA finished third in their respective groups and failed to advance.

Both MLS teams were victorious in the Semifinals, setting up a rematch of the 2006 and 2007 MLS Cups in the Final on August 5 at Gillette Stadium.

The teams played to a 2–2 draw after extra time. New England eventually defeated Houston 6–5 on penalty kicks.

CONCACAF Champions League 2008–09

The Houston Dynamo (MLS Cup winner), D.C. United (Supporters' Shield Winner), the New England Revolution (U.S. Open Cup winner and MLS Cup runner-up), and Chivas USA (Supporters' Shield runner-up) were the representatives in the rebranded successor to the CONCACAF Champions' Cup.

New England and Chivas USA entered at the preliminary round, and were eliminated over two legs by Joe Public of Trinidad and Tobago and Tauro of Panama, respectively.

D.C. and Houston were seeded into the Group Stage as the top seeds in Groups A and B, respectively.

D.C. was eliminated from Group A with two games remaining in group play, while Houston qualified for the Championship Round with a 1–0 win in their last match against Luis Ángel Firpo on November 26, which was postponed from Matchday 1 due to Hurricane Ike.

Houston was eliminated in the Quarterfinals over two legs by Atlante.

National competitions

2008 Lamar Hunt U.S. Open Cup

MLS awarded the top three finishers in each conference last season automatic berths into the 2008 U.S. Open Cup's Third Round.  D.C. United, the New England Revolution, and the New York Red Bulls qualified from the Eastern Conference while Chivas USA, the Houston Dynamo, and FC Dallas qualified from the Western Conference.  The rest of MLS's U.S.-based teams would have to compete for the final two berths into the third round via a seven-team playoff.  Eventually Chicago Fire and the Kansas City Wizards qualified by beating the Columbus Crew and the Colorado Rapids respectively.

Each of the qualified MLS teams was matched up against the winner of a Second Round game, all of whom came from either one of the USL's three divisions or the USASA, in the third round on July 1.  Three MLS teams were eliminated by these lower division clubs.  Chivas USA was eliminated by USL-1's Seattle Sounders, the New York Red Bulls were upset by Crystal Palace Baltimore of USL-2, and the Houston Dynamo lost a penalty shootout to the USL-1's Charleston Battery.

In the Quarterfinals on July 8, FC Dallas and the Kansas City Wizards were eliminated by the Charleston Battery and the Seattle Sounders, respectively.  This meant an MLS team, either D.C. United or the New England Revolution would face a USL-1 team in the final.

In the Semifinals on August 12, D.C. United upset the Open Cup holding Revolution by a score of 3 to 1.  This earned United a berth in the final against the USL-1's Charleston Battery on September 3 at RFK Stadium.

In the Final on September 3, D.C. United won their second U.S. Open Cup in a 2–1 win over the Charleston Battery.

2008 Canadian Championship

Due to the fact that none of the Canadian teams playing in the American soccer pyramid can qualify for Canada's berth in the CONCACAF Champions League through their leagues or the U.S. Open Cup, the Canadian Soccer Association was forced to develop a tournament to determine the country's representative in the Champions League.  The country's top three teams, MLS's Toronto FC and the USL-1's Montreal Impact and Vancouver Whitecaps FC were entered into the inaugural Canadian Championship.  The tournament was played as a double round robin group from May 27 to July 22.  The Montreal Impact finished first, claiming the Canadian berth in the Champions League.

All-Star game

The 2008 MLS All-Star Game was held at BMO Field in Toronto, Ontario, Canada, home of Toronto FC, on July 24.  The opponent was West Ham United, of England's Premier League.  It was the first time that the game was played outside the United States.

The game was won by the MLS All-Stars by a score of 3–2. Cuauhtémoc Blanco was named MVP of the game after assisting the All-Stars' first goal and scoring their second.

Coaches

Eastern Conference
Chicago Fire: Denis Hamlett
Columbus Crew: Sigi Schmid
D.C. United: Tom Soehn
Kansas City Wizards: Curt Onalfo
New England Revolution: Steve Nicol
New York Red Bulls: Juan Carlos Osorio
Toronto FC: John Carver

Western Conference
Chivas USA: Preki
Colorado Rapids: Gary Smith
FC Dallas: Steve Morrow, Marco Ferruzzi and Schellas Hyndman
Houston Dynamo: Dominic Kinnear
Real Salt Lake: Jason Kreis
San Jose Earthquakes: Frank Yallop

See also

List of transfers for the MLS 2008 Season
2007 MLS Expansion Draft

References

External links
 Official Site of Major League Soccer

 
1
Major League Soccer seasons